Maria Constantinescu (née Scheip; born 21 September 1934) is a Romanian former handballer who played for the Romanian national team.

Trophies 
Liga Națională:
Winner: 1961, 1963, 1967 

European Champions Cup:
Winner: 1964 

World Championship:
Gold Medalist: 1956, 1960, 1962

Personal life
Constantinescu resides in Bucharest, where she regularly attends church.

References

 
 
1934 births
Living people
People from Brașov County
Romanian female handball players   
Romanian people of German descent